HomeLA is a Los Angeles site-specific dance and performance project started by the choreographer and dancer Rebecca Bruno. The project functions on the donation of people's homes as temporary venue spaces.

The dance troupe seeks to view dance in domestic spaces, varying from the typical arenas that are viewed for performances. The interventions occur over a few days and the events happen irregularly every few months.

Bruno works in partnership with the dance nonprofit Dance Resource Los Angeles and the LA-based Pieter, a dance venue space, and the footage of the events resides at Los Angeles Contemporary Archive (LACA) where it can be accessed by the public.

Events 
The first installment of HomeLA happened over the course of a weekend at the home of Chloë Flores and Tim Lefebvre in their custom-built compound in Mount Washington, Los Angeles. Artist Flora Wiegmann swam laps in the home's outdoor pool entitled, Swimming Laps. Jill Stein's ZZA Sduai Airbara was an installation that occurred in the glass recreation room. Other performances have been held in Pacific Palisades, Highland Park, El Sereno, The Brewery, a home in downtown Los Angeles, San Marino, Claremont, and near the LA river in Frogtown.

References

External links
 HomeLA - official site

Performance art in Los Angeles
Dance in California
Arts organizations based in California
Non-profit organizations based in Los Angeles